Anthropology of Consciousness is the primary publication of the Society for the Anthropology of Consciousness, a section of the American Anthropological Association (AAA). It has been published since 1990.

Editors Nicole Torres and Gary Moore began the position in August 2015.

Prior to joining the AAA, the Society was called "Association for the Anthropological Study of Consciousness" (AASC), and published the AASC Newsletter and AASC Quarterly and earlier newsletters were also published.

Access
The journal is available online through AnthroSource, and abstracted in the following journals or CD-ROM services.
 Abstracts in Anthropology, from Volume 6, 1995.
 Anthropological Literature, from Volume 6, 1995.
 Exceptional Human Experience, from Volume 1, 1990 (selective).
 Sociological Abstracts, from Volume 6, 1995.

References

External links 
 Society for the Anthropology of Consciousness
 Wiley journal entry
 AnthroSource entry

Publications established in 1990
English-language journals
Biannual journals
Wiley-Blackwell academic journals